The following is a list of fictional astronauts from the era of Project Mercury and the Vostok programme, the beginning of the "Golden Age" of space travel.

Project Mercury era

Notes

References

Lists of fictional astronauts